Northern Ireland have only qualified once for a UEFA European Championship, the 2016 edition. They directly qualified as group winners, and were already secured of qualification after the penultimate matchday. For the draw of the end stage that took place on 12 December 2015, they were seeded in Pot 4.

Euro 2016

Group stage

Ranking of third-placed teams

Knockout phase

Round of 16

Overall record 

*Denotes draws including knockout matches decided via penalty shoot-out.

See also

References

Countries at the UEFA European Championship
Northern Ireland at the UEFA European Championship